Lourenço Andrade de Souza Feijo is a Brazilian footballer who played professionally in Belgium, Mexico, and the United States.

Andrade played two games with Tilleur Liégeois in Belgium during the 1996-1997 season.  He then moved to Mexico where he played for a variety of teams over the next six years.  In 2003, Andrade moved to the United States to sign with the El Paso Patriots of the USL A-League. 

In 2004, Andrade moved down to the DFW Tornados of the USL Premier Development League. He was All Southern Conference.  In 2005, he rejoined the Patriots who had moved down to the USL PDL as well.

References

Living people
1979 births
Brazilian footballers
Brazilian expatriate footballers
DFW Tornados players
El Paso Patriots players
RFC Liège players
Tigres UANL footballers
A-League (1995–2004) players
USL League Two players
Club Atlético Zacatepec players
Association football forwards
Major Arena Soccer League players
Monterrey Flash players
Brazilian expatriate sportspeople in the United States
Brazilian expatriate sportspeople in Mexico
Brazilian expatriate sportspeople in Belgium
Expatriate soccer players in the United States
Expatriate footballers in Mexico
Expatriate footballers in Belgium
Professional Arena Soccer League players